David Octavius Hill (20 May 1802 – 17 May 1870) was a Scottish painter, photographer and arts activist. He formed Hill & Adamson studio with the engineer and photographer Robert Adamson between 1843 and 1847 to pioneer many aspects of photography in Scotland.

Early life

David Octavius Hill was born in 1802 in Perth. His father, a bookseller and publisher, helped to re-establish Perth Academy and David was educated there as were his brothers. When his older brother Alexander joined the publishers Blackwood's in Edinburgh, Hill went there to study at the School of Design. He learned lithography and produced Sketches of Scenery in Perthshire which was published as an album of views. His landscape paintings were shown in the Institution for the Promotion of the Fine Arts in Scotland, and he was among the artists dissatisfied with the Institution who established a separate Scottish Academy in 1829 with the assistance of his close friend Henry Cockburn. A year later Hill took on unpaid secretarial duties. He sought commissions in book illustration, with four sketches being used to illustrate The Glasgow and Garnkirk Railway Prospectus in 1832, and went on to provide illustrations for editions of Walter Scott and Robert Burns.

In the 1830s he is listed as living at 24 Queen Street, in Edinburgh's New Town. In 1836 the Royal Scottish Academy began to pay him a salary as secretary, and with this security he married his fiancée Ann Macdonald the following year. After the birth of their daughter, Charlotte Hill, Ann was invalided, and died on 5 October 1841, aged 36, and was  buried with her family in Greyfriars Churchyard in Perth. Charlotte Hill went on to marry the author Walter Scott Dalgleish LLD and is buried in Grange Cemetery, The Grange, Edinburgh.

He continued to produce illustrations and to paint landscapes on commission. During this period he lived at 28 Inverleith Row in Edinburgh's northern suburbs.

Free Church of Scotland
 

Hill was present at the Disruption Assembly in 1843 when over 450 ministers walked out of the Church of Scotland assembly and down to another assembly hall to found the Free Church of Scotland. He decided to record the dramatic scene with the encouragement of his friend Lord Cockburn and another spectator, the physicist Sir David Brewster who suggested using the new invention, photography, to get likenesses of all the ministers present. Brewster was himself experimenting with this technology which only dated back to 1839, and he introduced Hill to another enthusiast, Robert Adamson. Hill and Adamson took a series of photographs of those who had been present and of the setting. The  x  painting was eventually completed in 1866.

Photography studio

Hill moved to "Calton Hill Stairs" in 1850.

Their collaboration, with Hill providing skill in composition and lighting, and Adamson considerable sensitivity and dexterity in handling the camera, proved extremely successful, and they soon broadened their subject matter. Adamson's studio, "Rock House", on Calton Hill in Edinburgh became the centre of their photographic experiments. Using the calotype process, they produced a wide range of portraits depicting well-known Scottish luminaries of the time, including Hugh Miller, both in the studio and outdoors, often amongst the elaborate tombs in Greyfriars Kirkyard.

They photographed local and Fife landscapes and urban scenes, including images of the Scott Monument under construction in Edinburgh. As well as the great and the good, they photographed ordinary working folk, particularly the fishermen of Newhaven, and the fishwives who carried the fish in creels the 3 miles (5 km) uphill to the city of Edinburgh to sell them round the doors, with their cry of "Caller herrin" (fresh herring). They produced several groundbreaking "action" photographs of soldiers and - perhaps their most famous photograph - two priests walking side by side.

Their partnership produced around 3,000 prints, but was cut short after only four years due to the ill health and death of Adamson in 1848. The calotypes faded under sunlight, so had to be kept in albums, and though Hill continued the studio for some months, he became less active and abandoned the studio, though he continued to sell prints of the photographs and to use them as an aid for composing paintings. In 1862 he remarried, to the sculptor Amelia Robertson Paton, 20 years his junior, and around that time took up photography again, but the results were more static and less successful than his collaboration with Adamson. He was badly affected by the death of his daughter and his work slowed. In 1866 he finished the Disruption picture which received wide acclaim, though many of the participants had died by then. The photographer F.C. Annan produced fine reduced facsimiles of the painting for sale throughout the Free Church, and a group of subscribers raised £1,200 to buy the painting for the church. In 1869 illness forced him to give up his post as secretary to the RSA, and he died in May 1870.

Hill is buried in Dean Cemetery, Edinburgh - one of the finest Victorian cemeteries in Scotland. He is portrayed in a bust sculpted by his second wife, Amelia, who is buried alongside him.

Exhibitions
Some of his photographs were put on show in Glasgow in 1954 but the first major exhibition of his work was in 1963 in Essen, Germany.

References

Further reading
 Macmillan, Duncan (1984), Scottish Painting: The Later Enlightenment, in Parker, Geoff (ed.), Cencrastus No. 19, Winter 1984, pp. 25 – 27, 
 Michaelson, Katherine (1970), David Octavius Hill and Robert Adamson, catalogue for Scottish Arts Council exhibitions

External links

Works in the National Galleries of Scotland
Metropolitan Museum of Art - David Octavius Hill (1802-1870) and Robert Adamson (1821-1848)

British portrait photographers
19th-century Scottish photographers
1802 births
1870 deaths
People from Perth, Scotland
Burials at the Dean Cemetery
People educated at Perth Academy
Alumni of the Edinburgh College of Art
19th-century Scottish painters
Scottish male painters
19th-century Scottish male artists